Mateusz Szałek (born 16 October 1991 in Szczecin) is a Polish football player who currently unemployed.

Career

Club
Szałek began his football career in KP Police where he played for youth team. In 2007, he moved to Amica Wronki. In 2008, Szałek played for Chemik Police. In the 2008-09 season, he made 22 appearances and scored one goal. Then he was transferred to Lech Poznań.

On 12 December 2009, he debuted for Lech Poznań in 2-0 victory over Korona Kielce.

International
Szałek made one appearance for Poland U-19 national team.

Family 
Mateusz Szałek has two brothers who also are footballers – Jakub plays for Odra Wodzisław and Michał plays for Gryf Słupsk.

References

External links 
 

1991 births
Living people
Sportspeople from Szczecin
Polish footballers
Association football midfielders
Lech Poznań players
Pogoń Szczecin players
Flota Świnoujście players
Ekstraklasa players